Magnolia is an unincorporated community in Clinch County, in the U.S. state of Georgia.

History
An old variant name was "Polk". A post office called Polk was established in 1851, the name was changed to Magnolia in 1852, and the post office closed in 1861. The present name is after a grove of magnolia trees near the original town site.

The Georgia General Assembly incorporated Magnolia as a town in 1854; the town's municipal charter was repealed in 1995.

Magnolia once held the county seat, a courthouse having built at the site in 1852. The courthouse burned to the ground in 1856, at which time the county seat was transferred to Homerville.

References

Former municipalities in Georgia (U.S. state)
Unincorporated communities in Clinch County, Georgia
Populated places disestablished in 1995